Hestor Lockhart Stevens (October 1, 1803 – May 7, 1864) was a politician from the U.S. state of Michigan.

Stevens was born in Lima, New York and attended the common schools.  He studied law, was admitted to the bar and commenced practice in Rochester, New York.  He ranked as major general of militia of western New York.

Stevens later moved to Pontiac, Michigan.  In 1852, he was elected as a Democrat from Michigan's newly created 4th congressional district to the 33rd United States Congress, serving from March 4, 1853 to March 3, 1855.

Stevens was not a candidate for re-election in 1854 and resumed the practice of law in Washington, D.C.  He died in Washington, D.C. and is interred there in Oak Hill Cemetery.

References

The Political Graveyard

External links 
 

1803 births
1864 deaths
American militia generals
Burials at Oak Hill Cemetery (Washington, D.C.)
Democratic Party members of the United States House of Representatives from Michigan
People from Lima, New York
Politicians from Rochester, New York
Politicians from Pontiac, Michigan
19th-century American politicians
Lawyers from Rochester, New York
19th-century American lawyers
Military personnel from Michigan